Salina Creek is a tributary of the Sevier River, in Utah.

Its mouth is at its confluence with the Sevier River at an elevation of 5118 feet just west of Salina, Utah, in Sevier County, Utah.

History
From 1830 into the 1850s, the Old Spanish Trail trade route passed westward, entering the Great Basin through the Salina Creek canyon to cross the San Rafael Swell, between the Green River and the Sevier River.

See also
List of rivers of Utah

References

External links

Rivers of Utah
Old Spanish Trail (trade route)
Rivers of Sanpete County, Utah
Rivers of Sevier County, Utah